SKUs or Skus may refer to:

 SKUs, abbreviation for stock keeping units
 Sküs, a high-ranking card in tarot card games

See also
 SKU (disambiguation)